Anderson's white-bellied rat (Niviventer andersoni) is a species of rodent in the family Muridae. It is endemic to China and known from Yunnan, Sichuan, and Shaanxi provinces. Its range might extend to northern Guizhou.
Its species name "andersoni" was chosen to honor American scientific collector Malcolm Playfair Anderson.

References

Rats of Asia
Niviventer
Endemic fauna of China
Rodents of China
Mammals described in 1911
Taxa named by Oldfield Thomas
Taxonomy articles created by Polbot